Litsea is a genus of evergreen or deciduous trees or shrubs belonging to the laurel family, Lauraceae. The genus includes a large number of accepted species in tropical and subtropical areas of North America and Asia.

Characteristics

They are typically dioecious trees or shrubs. The leaves can be either deciduous or evergreen depending on species, and aromatic. They have leaves alternate or opposite or in whorls. The inconspicuous flowers range from greenish to white, greenish-yellow, to yellowish. The inflorescences are pseudo-umbels, flat-topped or rounded flower clusters, each pseudo-umbel with an involucre of four or six decussate bracts.

Species
Currently accepted species include:

Litsea aban-gibotii Ng
Litsea accedens (Blume) Boerl.
Litsea accedentoides Koord. & Valeton
Litsea acrantha Ridl.
Litsea acutifolia (Liou Ho) Kosterm.
Litsea acutivena Hayata
Litsea aestivalis (L.) Fernald
Litsea akoensis Hayata
Litsea alba Kosterm.
Litsea albayana S.Vidal
Litsea albescens (Hook.f.) D.G.Long
Litsea albicans (Kurz) Hook.f.
Litsea albida (Kosterm.) Kosterm.
Litsea alleniana A.C.Sm.
Litsea alveolata C.K.Allen
Litsea amicorum Kosterm.
Litsea anamo Kosterm.
Litsea andreana Ng
Litsea aneityensis Guillaumin
Litsea angulata Blume
Litsea anomala Merr.
Litsea areolata (Blume) Boerl.
Litsea artocarpifolia Gamble
Litsea assamica Hook.f.
Litsea aurea Kosterm.
Litsea auricolor Kosterm.
Litsea auriculata S.S.Chien & W.C.Cheng
Litsea australis B.Hyland
Litsea bainingensis Rech.
Litsea balansae Lecomte
Litsea barringtonioides Kosterm.
Litsea baruringensis Elmer
Litsea baviensis Lecomte
Litsea beilschmiediifolia H.W.Li
Litsea bennettii B.Hyland
Litsea bernhardensis C.K.Allen
Litsea beusekomii Kosterm.
Litsea biflora H.P.Tsui
Litsea bindoniana (F.Muell.) F.Muell.
Litsea boerlagei Kosterm.
Litsea bombaiensis M.R.Almeida
Litsea borneensis (Meisn.) Boerl.
Litsea bourdillonii Gamble
Litsea brachypoda C.K.Allen
Litsea brachystachya (Blume) Fern.-Vill.
Litsea brassii O.C.Schmidt
Litsea brawas (Blume) Boerl.
Litsea breviumbellata C.K.Allen
Litsea brookeana Kosterm.
Litsea buinensis Kosterm.
Litsea burckelloides A.C.Sm.
Litsea calicaris Kirk
Litsea calophylla (Miq.) Mansf.
Litsea calophyllantha K.Schum.
Litsea cambodiana Lecomte
Litsea cangyuanensis J.Li & H.W.Li
Litsea caroli Teschner
Litsea carrii Kosterm.
Litsea castanea Hook.f.
Litsea catubigensiskos Kosterm.
Litsea caulocarpa Merr.
Litsea ceramensis Kosterm.
Litsea chaffonjonii H.Lév.
Litsea chartacea Hook.f.
Litsea chengshuzhii H.P.Tsui
Litsea chewii Kosterm.
Litsea chinpingensis Yen C.Yang & P.H.Huang
Litsea chrysoneura Kosterm.
Litsea chrysophoena (Blume) Boerl.
Litsea chrysopleura (Blume) Boerl.
Litsea chunii W.C.Cheng
Litsea cinerascens Ridl.
Litsea citronella Kosterm.
Litsea clarissae (Teschner) Kosterm.
Litsea clarkei Prain
Litsea claviflora Gamble
Litsea clemensii C.K.Allen
Litsea coelestis H.P.Tsui
Litsea collina S.Moore
Litsea complanata C.K.Allen
Litsea confusa Koord. & Valeton
Litsea connorsii B.Hyland
Litsea cordata (Jack) Hook.f.
Litsea coreana H.Lév.
Litsea coriacea (B.Heyne ex Nees) Hook.f.
Litsea costalis (Nees) Kosterm.
Litsea costata (Blume) Boerl.
Litsea crassifolia (Blume) Boerl.
Litsea crebriflora S.Moore
Litsea crenata C.K.Allen
Litsea cubeba (Lour.) Pers.
Litsea cuprea Merr.
Litsea curtisii Gamble
Litsea cuspidata (Blume) Boerl.
Litsea cuttingiana C.K.Allen
Litsea cylindrocarpa Gamble
Litsea densiflora (Teschner) Kosterm.
Litsea deplanchei Guillaumin
Litsea depressa H.P.Tsui
Litsea dielsiana Teschner
Litsea dilleniifolia P.Y.Pai & P.H.Huang
Litsea diospyrifolia Quisumb.
Litsea discocalyx Kosterm.
Litsea diversifolia Blume
Litsea domarensis O.C.Schmidt
Litsea dorsalicana M.Q.Han & Y.S.Huang
Litsea doshia (D.Don) Kosterm.
Litsea dunniana H.Lév.
Litsea eberhardtii H.Liu
Litsea elliptica Blume
Litsea ellipticibacca Merr.
Litsea elmeri Merr.
Litsea elongata (Nees) Hook.f.
Litsea engleriana Teschner
Litsea erectinervia Kosterm.
Litsea eugenioides A.Chev. ex H.Liu
Litsea exsudens Kosterm.
Litsea fenestrata Gamble
Litsea ferruginea Blume
Litsea ficoidea Kosterm.
Litsea filipedunculata Kosterm.
Litsea firma (Blume) Hook.f.
Litsea flexuosa (Blume) Boerl.
Litsea floribunda (Blume) Gamble
Litsea fluminensis Kosterm.
Litsea fo K.Schum. & Lauterb.
Litsea formanii Kosterm.
Litsea forstenii (Blume) Boerl.
Litsea fosbergii Kosterm.
Litsea foveola Kosterm.
Litsea foxiana Gamble
Litsea fulva (Blume) Fern.-Vill.
Litsea fulvosericea C.K.Allen
Litsea garciae S.Vidal
Litsea gardneri (Thwaites) Meisn.
Litsea gemelliflora (Miq.) Boerl.
Litsea ghatica Saldanha
Litsea gigaphylla Kosterm.
Litsea gilgiana Teschner
Litsea glaberrima (Thwaites) Trimen
Litsea glabrata (Wall. ex Nees) Hook.f.
Litsea glaucescens Kunth
Litsea globifera Kosterm.
Litsea globosa Kosterm.
Litsea globularia Ng
Litsea glutinosa (Lour.) C.B.Rob.
Litsea gongshanensis H.W.Li
Litsea gorayana Udayan & Robi
Litsea gracilipes Hook.f.
Litsea gracilis Gamble
Litsea grandifolia Lecomte
Litsea grandis (Nees) Hook.f.
Litsea granitica B.Hyland
Litsea grayana A.C.Sm.
Litsea greenmaniana C.K.Allen
Litsea griffithii Gamble
Litsea grisea Boerl.
Litsea guppyi (F.Muell.) Forman
Litsea habbemensis C.K.Allen
Litsea hayatae Kaneh.
Litsea helferi Hook.f.
Litsea henricksonii Kosterm.
Litsea himalayensis R.Kr.Singh
Litsea hirsutior Kosterm.
Litsea hirsutissima Gamble
Litsea hirta (Blume) Boerl.
Litsea honghoensis H.Liu
Litsea hookeri (Meisn.) D.G.Long
Litsea hornei A.C.Sm.
Litsea humboldtiana Guillaumin
Litsea hunanensis Yen C.Yang & P.H.Huang
Litsea hupehana Hemsl.
Litsea hutchinsonii Merr.
Litsea hypophaea Hayata
Litsea ichangensis Gamble
Litsea ilocana Merr.
Litsea imbricata Guillaumin
Litsea impressa (Blume) Boerl.
Litsea imthurnii Turrill
Litsea indoverticillata Robi & Udayan
Litsea insignis (Blume) Boerl.
Litsea intermedia (Blume) Boerl.
Litsea irianensis Kosterm.
Litsea iteodaphne (Nees) Hook.f.
Litsea japonica (Thunb.) Juss.
Litsea jaswirii Ng
Litsea johorensis Gamble
Litsea kakkachensis R.Ganesan
Litsea kauloensis Teschner
Litsea keralana Kosterm.
Litsea kerrii Kosterm.
Litsea khasyana Meisn.
Litsea kingii Hook.f.
Litsea kobuskiana C.K.Allen
Litsea kurzii King ex Hook.f.
Litsea kwangsiensis Yen C.Yang & P.H.Huang
Litsea kwangtungensis H.T.Chang
Litsea laeta (Nees) Trimen
Litsea laevigata (Nees) Gamble
Litsea lanceolata (Blume) Kosterm.
Litsea lancifolia (Roxb. ex Nees) Fern.-Vill.
Litsea lancilimba Merr.
Litsea lecardii Guillaumin
Litsea ledermannii Teschner
Litsea leefeana Merr.
Litsea leiantha (Kurz) Hook.f.
Litsea leytensis Merr.
Litsea liboshengii H.P.Tsui
Litsea ligustrina (Nees) Fern.-Vill.
Litsea lithocarpoides Kosterm.
Litsea litseifolia (C.K.Allen) Yen C.Yang & P.H.Huang
Litsea liyuyingii H.Liu
Litsea longepedunculata Kosterm.
Litsea longipedicellata Kosterm.
Litsea longipes Hook.f.
Litsea longistaminata (H.Liu) Kosterm.
Litsea luzonica (Blume) Fern.-Vill.
Litsea machilifolia Gamble
Litsea machiloides Yen C.Yang & P.H.Huang
Litsea mafuluensis C.K.Allen
Litsea magnifolia Gillespie
Litsea maingayi Hook.f.
Litsea mairei H.Lév.
Litsea maluensis Teschner
Litsea martabanica (Kurz) Hook.f.
Litsea mathuataensis A.C.Sm.
Litsea megalophylla Merr.
Litsea meghalayensis R.Kr.Singh
Litsea mekongensis Lecomte
Litsea melchioriana (Teschner) Kosterm.
Litsea mellifera A.C.Sm.
Litsea membranifolia Hook.f.
Litsea meyeri Kosterm.
Litsea miana Guillaumin
Litsea micrantha Merr.
Litsea microphylla Merr.
Litsea minor Teschner
Litsea miquelii I.M.Turner
Litsea mishmiensis Hook.f.
Litsea mollis Hemsl.
Litsea monopetala (Roxb.) Pers.
Litsea montis-dulit Airy Shaw
Litsea morobensis C.K.Allen
Litsea morotaiensis Kosterm.
Litsea morrisonensis Hayata
Litsea moupinensis Lecomte
Litsea muellerorum I.M.Turner
Litsea myricopsis H.Lév.
Litsea myristicifolia (Wall. ex Nees) Hook.f.
Litsea mysorensis Gamble
Litsea nemoralis (Thwaites) Trimen
Litsea neocaledonica S.Moore
Litsea neohebridensis Kosterm.
Litsea nervosa (Meisn.) Grierson & D.G.Long
Litsea nigrescens Gamble
Litsea nigricans (Meisn.) Boerl.
Litsea nitida (Roxb. ex Nees) Hook.f.
Litsea noronhae Blume
Litsea novoguinensis Teschner
Litsea novoleontis Bartlett
Litsea nuculanea (Kurz) Hook.f.
Litsea oblongifolia Merr.
Litsea obscura (Blume) Boerl.
Litsea ochracea (Blume) Boerl.
Litsea oleoides (Meisn.) Hook.f.
Litsea oligophlebia H.T.Chang
Litsea oppositifolia Gibbs
Litsea orizabae Mez
Litsea orocola Kosterm.
Litsea ovalifolia (Wight) Trimen
Litsea ovalis Kosterm.
Litsea pallens Lundell
Litsea pallida (Blume) Boerl.
Litsea pallidifolia Merr.
Litsea palmatinervia (Meisn.) Benth. & Hook.f. ex Drake
Litsea palustris Kosterm.
Litsea panamanja (Buch.-Ham. ex Nees) Hook.f.
Litsea paoueensis Guillaumin
Litsea papillosa C.K.Allen
Litsea papuana K.Schum.
Litsea parvifolia (Hemsl.) Mez
Litsea pedicellata Bartlett
Litsea pedunculata (Diels) Yen C.Yang & P.H.Huang
Litsea penangiana Hook.f.
Litsea pentaflora Guillaumin
Litsea pentagona Merr.
Litsea perfulva Elmer
Litsea perglabra C.K.Allen
Litsea perlucida C.K.Allen
Litsea perrottetii (Blume) Fern.-Vill.
Litsea persella Ridl.
Litsea philippinensis Merr.
Litsea phuwuaensis Ngerns.
Litsea pickeringii (A.Gray ex Seem.) Benth. & Hook.f. ex Drake
Litsea pittosporifolia Yen C.Yang & P.H.Huang
Litsea plateifolia Elmer
Litsea polyneura (Meisn.) Boerl.
Litsea populifolia Gamble
Litsea pringlei Bartlett
Litsea prolixa S.Moore
Litsea propinqua (Blume) Boerl.
Litsea pruriens Kosterm.
Litsea pseudoculitlawan Nees
Litsea pseudoelongata H.Liu
Litsea pseudolongifolia Kosterm.
Litsea pseudoumbellata Kosterm.
Litsea psilophylla Kosterm.
Litsea pumila Kosterm.
Litsea punctata Boerl.
Litsea punctulata Kosterm.
Litsea pungens Hemsl.
Litsea quadrangularis Kosterm.
Litsea quercoides Elmer
Litsea racemosa C.T.White
Litsea rangoonensis (Meisn.) Hook.f.
Litsea resinosa Blume
Litsea reticulata (Meisn.) Benth. & Hook.f. ex F.Muell.
Litsea richii A.C.Sm.
Litsea ridleyi Gamble
Litsea rigidifrons Kosterm.
Litsea riparia (Blume) Boerl.
Litsea ripidion Guillaumin
Litsea robusta Blume
Litsea rotundata (Blume) Kosterm.
Litsea rotundifolia (Nees) Hemsl.
Litsea rubescens Lecomte
Litsea rubicunda Kosterm.
Litsea rubiginosa Boerl.
Litsea rubra Blume
Litsea salicifolia (Roxb. ex Nees) Hook.f.
Litsea saligna (Nees) N.P.Balakr.
Litsea samoensis (Christoph.) A.C.Sm.
Litsea sandakanensis Merr.
Litsea santapaui Kosterm.
Litsea sarawacensis Gamble
Litsea schlechteri Teschner
Litsea scortechinii Gamble
Litsea seemannii (Meisn.) Benth. & Hook.f. ex Drake
Litsea segregata Elmer
Litsea semecarpifolia (Wall. ex Nees) Hook.f.
Litsea sepikensis Kosterm.
Litsea sericea (Wall. ex Nees) Hook.f.
Litsea sessiliflora Hook.f.
Litsea sessilifructa (C.J.Qi & K.W.Liu) L.Wu & J.J.Zhou
Litsea sessilis Boerl.
Litsea sinoglobosa J.Li & H.W.Li
Litsea solomonensis C.K.Allen
Litsea spathacea Gamble
Litsea spathulata Kosterm.
Litsea staintonii Kosterm.
Litsea steenisii Kosterm.
Litsea stenophylla Guillaumin
Litsea stickmanii Merr.
Litsea stocksii (Meisn.) Hook.f.
Litsea subauriculata Kosterm.
Litsea subcoriacea Yen C.Yang & P.H.Huang
Litsea suberosa Yen C.Yang & P.H.Huang
Litsea suboppositifolia Ng
Litsea subovata (Miq.) Kosterm.
Litsea subumbelliflora (Blume) Ng
Litsea sulavesiana Kosterm.
Litsea sumatrana Boerl.
Litsea szemaois (H.Liu) J.Li & H.W.Li
Litsea talaumifolia Kosterm.
Litsea tannaensis Guillaumin
Litsea taronensis H.W.Li
Litsea tenuipes Ridl.
Litsea teysmannii Gamble
Litsea tharpiana Standl.
Litsea thorelii Lecomte
Litsea tibetana Yen C.Yang & P.H.Huang
Litsea timonioides Kosterm.
Litsea timoriana Span.
Litsea tomentosa Blume
Litsea travancorica Gamble
Litsea trichophylla Kosterm.
Litsea triflora Guillaumin
Litsea tsinlingensis Yen C.Yang & P.H.Huang
Litsea tuberculata Boerl.
Litsea turfosa Kosterm.
Litsea udayanii Robi
Litsea umbellata (Lour.) Merr.
Litsea unita Boerl.
Litsea urdanetensis Elmer
Litsea utilis (Meisn.) Boerl.
Litsea vang Lecomte
Litsea vanoverberghii Merr.
Litsea variabilis Hemsl.
Litsea varians (Blume) Boerl.
Litsea veitchiana Gamble
Litsea velutina Elmer
Litsea venulosa (Meisn.) Hook.f.
Litsea versteeghii C.K.Allen
Litsea verticillata Hance
Litsea verticillifolia Yen C.Yang & P.H.Huang
Litsea virens (Nees) Boerl.
Litsea viridis H.Liu
Litsea vitiana (Meisn.) Benth. & Hook.f. ex Drake
Litsea walkeri Trimen
Litsea whiteana C.K.Allen
Litsea whitfordii Merr.
Litsea wightiana (Nees) Wall. ex Hook.f.
Litsea wilsonii Gamble
Litsea wrayi Gamble
Litsea xanthophylla (Blume) Boerl.
Litsea yaoshanensis Yen C.Yang & P.H.Huang
Litsea yunnanensis Yen C.Yang & P.H.Huang

References

 
Lauraceae genera
Dioecious plants
Australasian realm flora
Indomalayan realm flora
Taxa named by Jean-Baptiste Lamarck